Dār ul-Funun (meaning "polytechnic college"), established by the Royal Vizier to Nasereddin Shah in 1851, is the oldest Western-style institute of higher learning in Iran.

Introduction
Founded by Amir Kabir, then the royal vizier to Nasereddin Shah, the Shah of Persia,  Dār al-Funun originally was conceived as a polytechnic to train upper-class Persian youth in medicine, engineering, military science, and geology.  It was similar in scope and purpose to American land grant colleges like Purdue and Texas A&M.  Like them, it developed and expanded its mission over the next hundred years, eventually becoming the University of Tehran.

The institute was planned by the Iranian educated Mirzā Rezā Mohandes (fa), and built by the architect Mohammad-Taqi Khān Memār-Bāshi (fa) under the supervision of the Qajar prince Bahrām Mirzā. Facilities such as an assembly hall, a theater, library, cafeteria, and a publishing house were built for the institute. In 1930, the building was destroyed by Mirzā Yahyā Khan Qarāgozlu (also known as Etemād od-Dowleh), then Minister of Education, and rebuilt based on a Russian engineering design. Many parts of the institute were later on absorbed and merged into the newly establishing Tehran University. The Faculty of Medicine for example, was particularly the successor to the Dār ul-Funun  Department of Medicine, established in 1851, which had become the School of Medicine (Madreseh-ye Tebb) in 1919. The elite school was training 287 students by 1889, and had graduated 1100 students by 1891. During this time, the faculty consisted of 16 European, and 26 Iranian professors.

List of presidents
 Mirzā Mohammad-Ali Khān Shirāzi (fa) (1851–52)
 Aziz Khān Mokri (1852)
 Mirzā Mohammad Khān Amir-Tumān (1852–57)
 Ali-Qoli Mirzā Etezād os-Saltaneh (1857–80)
 Ali-Qoli Khān Hedayāt Mokhber od-Dowleh (fa) (1880–96)
 Jafar-Qoli Khān Hedāyat Nayyer ol-Molk (fa)
 Mohammad-Hossein Khān Adib od-Dowleh
 Rezā-Qoli Khān Hedāyat Nayyer ol-Molk (fa) (1896–1906)

Notable teachers

 Dr. Jakob Eduard Polak (1818–1891) – medicine and pharmacy
 Lieutenant August Karl Krziž (hr) (1814–1886) – artillery
 Captain Joseph Czarnotta – mineralogy
 Captain Zatti – engineering
 Alfred Baron de Gumoëns – infantry
 Johann von Nemiro – cavalry

 Michele Materazzo
 Francesco Materazzo
 Luigi Pesce
 Enrico Andreini – infantry
 Focchetti – pharmacy, physics and chemistry
 Jules Richard (fa) (1852–1891) – French language
 Ernest Cloquet
 Alfred Jean Baptiste Lemaire (1842–1907) – music
 Fedor Karaczay
 Alexandre Bohler – mathematics
 Borowski – geography
 Hawkin
 Félix Vauvillier
 Johan Louis Schlimmer (fa) (1819–1881)
 Joseph Désiré Tholozan (1820–1897)
 Albert Joseph Gasteiger (1823–1890)
 Ernst Höltzer (1835–1911)
Martiros Khan Davidkhanian (1843-1905) – French and Russian
Eskandar Khan Davidkhanian - French and Russian

 Mirzā Malkam Khān Nāzem od-Dowleh (1834–1908) – mathematics and geometry
 Mirzā Abdolghaffār Khān Najm od-Dowleh (fa) (1843–1908) – mathematics
 Mirzā Mohammad-Hossein Gharib Shams ol-Olamā (fa) (1843–1926) – Persian and Arabic languages
 Mohammad-Hossein Foroughi (fa) (1839–1907) – history
 Joseph Richard (fa) (1869–1935) – French language
 Abdorrazzāq Khān Baghāyeri (fa) (1869–1953) – engineering
 Dr. Mohammd-Hossein Loqmān Adham Loqmān od-Dowleh (fa) (1879–1951) – medicine
 Dr. Mohammd-Hassan Loqmān Adham Loqmān od-Molk (fa) (1884–1957) – medicine
 Ahmad Bahmanyār (fa) (1884–1955) – Persian language

Notable alumni

Politicians

 Mirzā Hossein Khān Moshir od-Dowleh Sepahsālār (1828–1881) – prime minister (1871–73)
 Ali-Qoli Khān Hedāyat Mokhber od-Dowleh (fa) (1829–1897) – politician
 Jafar-Qoli Khān Hedāyat Nayyer ol-Molk (fa) (1832–1915) – politician
 Mirzā Mahmoud Khān Moshāver ol-Molk (fa) (1834–1920) – politician
 Narimān Khān Enāgolopiān Qavām os-Saltaneh (fa) (1836–18??) – diplomat
 Prince Abdolhamid Mirzā Nāser od-Dowleh (fa) (1840–1892) – politician
 Mohammad-Hassan Khān Etemād os-Saltaneh (ru) (1843–1896) – politician
 Dr. Mirzā Ali-Naghi Khān Hakim ol-Molk (fa) (18??–1903) – physician and politician
 Prince Abdolmajid Mirzā Eyn od-Dowleh (1845–1927) – prime minister
 Prince Abdossamad Mirzā Ezz od-Dowleh (1845–1929) – politician
 Mortezā-Qoli Khān Hedāyat Sanie od-Dowleh (1856–1911) – politician
 Prince Kāmrān Mirzā Nāyeb os-Saltaneh (1856–1928) – prime minister (1909)
 Prince Abdolhossein Mirzā Farmān-Farmā (1857–1939) – prime minister (1915)
 Abbās-Qoli Khān Ādamiyat (fa) (1861–1939) – politician
 Abolhassan Khān Ardalān Fakhr ol-Molk (fa) (1862–1926) – politician
 Mahmoud Khān Alāmir Ehteshām os-Saltaneh (1863–1936) – politician and diplomat
 Mousā Khān Hakimi Nazm os-Saltaneh (fa) (1864–1944) – politician
 Prince Mohammad Mirzā Kāshef os-Saltaneh (1866–1929) – diplomat and entrepreneur
 Mirzā Jafar Khān Esfandiāri Yamin ol-Mamālek (fa) (1867–1917) – politician
 Dr. Mohammad Sheikh Ehyā ol-Molk (fa) (1868–1938) – physician and politician
 Mirzā Nasrollāh Khān Khalatbari Etelā ol-Molk (fa) (1868–1962) – politician
 Mortezā Khān Momtāz ol-Molk (fa) (1869–19??) – politician
 Dr. Farajollāh Ziāei Ziā ol-Atebba (fa) (1870–19??) – physician and politician
 Ebrahim Hakimi Hakim ol-Molk (1871–1959) – prime minister (1945–47)
 Mostafā Khān Navāei Nayyer os-Soltān (fa) (1873–1940) – politician
 Hedāyat-Qoli Khān Etezād ol-Molk (fa) (1873–1953) – politician
 Esmāil Khān Adib Moāzed ol-Molk (fa) (1874–1923) – politician
 Yahyā Shams Malekārā (fa) (1874–1945) – politician
 Mirzā Jahangir Khān Sur-e-Esrafil (1875–1908) – journalist and political activist
 Mirzā Ebrāhim Khān Amid os-Saltaneh (fa) (1875–19??) – politician
 Mirzā Ahmad Khān Etelā os-Saltaneh (fa) (1875–19??) – politician
 Dr. Hossein-Qoli Qezel-Ayāgh (fa) (1875–1957) – physician and politician
 Dr. Hossein Khān Bahrāmi Ehyā os-Saltaneh (fa) (1876–1940) – politician
 Prince Soleimān Mirzā Eskandari (1876–1944) – political activist
 Mirzā Hassan Khān Esfandiāri Mohtashem os-Saltaneh (1876–1945) – politician
 Asadollāh Ghaffārzādeh (fa) (1876–19??) – journalist and political activist
 Hossein Samiei (1876–1954) – politician
 Khalil Fahimi Fahim ol-Molk (ru) (1876–1953) – politician
 Dr. Ali Khān Partow-Azam Hakim Azam (fa) (1877–1938) – physician and politician
 Mohammad-Ali Foroughi Zokā ol-Molk (1877–1942) – prime minister (1925–26, 1933–35 and 1941–42) and scholar
 Abdolhamid Saqafi Matin os-Saltaneh (fa) (1878–1917) – journalist and politician
 Mohammad-Ali Farzin (fa) (1878–1941) – politician
 Prince Nosratollāh Mirzā Amir Azam (fa) (1879–1916) – politician
 Ebrāhim Monshizādeh (fa) (1879–1918) – political activist
 Mirzā Nasrollāh Khān Sheibāni Jalil ol-Molk (fa) (1879–1959) – politician
 Yār-Mohammad Khān Afshār Sardār Saeid (fa) (1880–1936) – politician
 Prince Mohammad-Hāshem Mirzā Afsar (fa) (1880–1940) – politician
 Ahmad Fereydouni (fa) (1881–1969) – politician
 Mirzā Loqmān Nahourāi (fa) (1882–19??) – politician
 Gholām-Hossein Rahnamā (fa) (1882–1946) – minister of education
 Mirzā Farajollāh Khān Bahrāmi Dabir Azam (fa) (1882–1948) – politician
 Sediqeh Dowlatābādi (1882–1961) – journalist and political activist
 Ali-Akbar Hakimi (fa) (1883–19??) – politician
 Mirzā Hassan Farahmand Mokhber Hozour (fa) (1883–19??) – politician
 Ehsānollāh Khān Doustdār (1884–1939) – politician
 Dr. Hassan Loqmān Adham Hakim od-Dowleh (fa) (1884–1957) – physician and politician
 Dr. Ebrāhim Heshmat (1885–1919) – physician and politician
 Ali-Akbar Dāvar (1885–1937) – minister of justice
 Kāzem Khān Mojdehi Motamed Divān (fa) (1885–1964) – politician
 Ali-Asghar Zarrinkafsh (fa) (1885–1969) – politician
 Ali Mansour Mansour ol-Molk (1886–1974) – prime minister (1940–41)
 Ahmad Akhgar (fa) (1888–1969) – politician
 Asadollāh Yamin Esfandiāri Yamin ol-Mamālek (fa) (1889–1955) – politician
 Jamāleddin Akhavi (fa) (1891–1983) – politician
 Ghāsem Ghani (fa) (1893–1952) – diplomat
 Ali-Akbar Siāsi (1895–1990) – minister of foreign affairs
 Ali Soheili (1896–1958) – prime minister (1942–44)
 Mousā Nouri Esfandiāri (1896–1972) – minister of foreign affairs
 Dr. Javād Āshtiāni (fa) (1896–1981) – minister of health
 Abdolhossein Masoud Ansāri (fa) (1896–1984) – diplomat
 Abbās Eskandari (1897–1955) – politician
 Abolghāsem Narāghi (fa) (1899–1945) – politician
 Abdollāh Entezām (1899–1982) – diplomat
 Ebrāhim Fakhrāei (fa) (1899–1988) – politician
 Nasrollāh Entezām (1900–1980) – diplomat
 Shamseddin Amir-Alāei (fa) (1900–1994) – politician
 Hossein Naghavi (fa) (1901–1964) – politician
 Dr. Mehdi Āzar (fa) (1901–1994) – physician and politician
 Abdolhossein Hazhir (1902–1949) – prime minister (1948)
 Abbās-Qoli Golshāyān (fa) (1902–1990) – minister of finance
 Taghi Arāni (1903–1940) – political activist
 Mohammad-Ali Maleki (fa) (1903–1996) – politician
 Abdolhamid Zanganeh (fa) (1904–1951) – minister of education
 Rezā Rādmanesh (1905–1984) – politician
 Ali Amini (1905–1992) – prime minister (1961–62)
 Gholām-Hossein Sadighi (1905–1992) – minister of interior
 Taghi Nasr (fa) (1906–1985) – minister of finance
 Kāzem Hassibi (1906–1990) – politician
 Yadollāh Sahābi (1906–2002) – politician
 Fakhreddin Shādemān (fa) (1907–1967) – politician
 Fereydoun Keshāvarz (1907–2006) – politician
 Ali-Akbar Emāmi Ahari (fa) (1908–19??) – politician
 Ahmad Zirakzādeh (1908–1993) – politician
 Dr. Manouchehr Eghbāl (1909–1977) – prime minister (1957–60)
 Ahmad Houman (fa) (1909–1995) – politician
 Mohammad-Hossein Aliābādi (fa) (1909–1995) – politician
 Dr. Nosratollāh Kāsemi (fa) (1911–1995) – physician and politician
 Yahyā Sādegh Vaziri (fa) (1911–2013) – minister of justice
 Mozzafar Baghāei (1912–1987) – politician
 Javād Sadr (fa) (1912–2000) – diplomat
 Shamseddin Jazāyeri (fa) (1913–1990) – politician
 Shams Qanātābādi (fa) (1914–1988) – politician
 Ali Ardalān (1914–2000) – economist and politician
 Hassan Arsanjāni (1922–1969) – politician
 Fereydoun Motamed Vaziri (fa) (1922–2006) – politician
 Ziāeddin Shādemān (1923–2009) – politician
 Siāvash Kasrāei (1927–1996) – political activist
 Hossein Shāh-Hosseini (1928–2017) – politician
 Ebrāhim Yazdi (1931–2017) – minister of foreign affairs
 Mostafā Chamrān (1932–1981) – minister of national defence
 Abbās Amir-Entezām (1932–2018) – politician
 Mohammad-Hassan Eslāmi (fa) (1933–2018) – minister of communications
 Sādegh Ghotbzādeh (1936–1982) – minister of foreign affairs
 Mahmoud Kāzemi Dinān (fa) (1939–2007) – politician
 Abdolkarim Lāhiji (b. 1940) – political activist
 Kāzem Akrami (fa) (b. 1940) – minister of education
 Hamid Ashraf (1946–1976) – political activist
 Ali Nazari (fa) (b. 1947) – politician
 Mohammad Mofidi (fa) (1948–1972) – political activist
 Mohammad-Hossein Ādeli (b. 1953) – economist and politician
 Shahābeddin Bimeghdār (b. 1953) – politician
 Majid Qāsemi (b. 1952) – politician and economist
 Rezā Āmeri (fa) (b. 1961) – diplomat
 Dr. Shahābeddin Sadr (b. 1962) – minister of health

Military personnel

 General Amānollāh Khān Jahānbāni Ziā od-Dowleh (1869–1923) – Cossack Brigade general
 Admiral Ahmad Khān Daryābeigi (18??–1923) – Imperial Iranian Navy (IIN) admiral
 General Mahmoud Khosrowpanāh Ezām os-Soltān (fa) (1886–1972) – Gendarmerie general
 General Hādi Khānshaqāqi Hesn od-Dowleh (fa) (1889–1959) – IIA general
 General Ali-Asghar Naghdi (fa) (1895–1966) – IIA general and minister of war
 Admiral Gholām-Ali Bāyandor (1898–1941) – IIN admiral
 Colonel Sharafeddin Ghahramāni (fa) (1900–1942) – Imperial Iranian Air Force (IIAF) pilot
 General Hāj-Ali Razmārā (1901–1951) – Imperial Iranian Army (IIA) general and prime minister (1950–51)
 General Ahmad Zanganeh (fa) (1904–19??) – IIA general
 General Abbās Izadpanāh (fa) (1905–19??) – IIA general
 Admiral Farajollāh Rasāei (1908–2002) – IIN admiral
 General Mohammd-Taghi Riāhi (1911–1988) – IIA general
 General Mohammad-Vali Gharani (1913–1979) – IIA general
 General Hassan Toufāniān (1913–1998) – IIAF general
 Admiral Abbās Ramzi Atāei (1928–2018) – IIN admiral
 Admiral Kamāl Habibollāhi (1930–2016) – IIN admiral

Religion 

 Mírzá Ḥasan-i-Adíbu'l-ʻUlamá (Adíb) (1848-1919) – writer, Apostle of Baháʼu'lláh, Hand of the Cause of the Bahá’í Faith

Scholars

 Prince Jalāleddin Mirzā (1827–1872) – historian
 Dr. Mohammad Mirzā Kermānshāhi (fa) (1828–1908) – physician
 Mirzā Abolfazl Golpāygāni (1844–1914) – Bahá’í scholar
 Dr. Ali-Akbar Khān Nafisi Nāzem ol-Atebbā (1847–1924) – physician
 Dr. Mirzā Mahmoud Khān Boroujerdi (fa) (1856–1903) – physician
 Dr. Khalil Saqafi Alam od-Dowleh (fa) (1862–1944) – physician
 Ali-Mohammad Farahvashi Motarjem Homāyoun (fa) (1875–1968) – scholar
 Dr. Amir Khān Amir-Alam (fa) (1876–1961) – physician and politician
 Dr. Valiollāh Nasr (fa) (1878–1945) – physician and politician
 Abdolazim Gharib (ru) (1879–1965) – linguist
 Dr. Mehdi Malekzādeh (fa) (1881–1955) – physician
 Dr. Abdollāh Ahmadieh (fa) (1886–1959) – physician
 Dr. Hossein Khān Motamed (1893–1955) – surgeon
 Isā Sedigh (1894–1978) – scholar
 Abbās Eghbāl Āshtiāni (1896–1956) – historian
 Badiozzamān Forouzānfar (1897–1970) – scholar
 Abdorrasoul Khayyāmpour (fa) (1898–1979) – scholar
 Nasrollāh Falsafi (fa) (1901–1981) – scholar
 Mohammad Mohit Tabātabāei (fa) (1901–1992) – scholar
 Dr. Ahmad Farhād (fa) (1902–1971) – physician
 Mojtabā Minovi (1903–1977) – historian
 Dr. Mahmoud Najmābādi (fa) (1903–2000) – physician
 Hossein-Qoli Mostaān (fa) (1904–1983) – scholar
 Dr. Hossein Rezāei (fa) (1904–1993) – psychologist
 Mehdi Bayāni (fa) (1906–1968) – scholar
 Dr. Abdolhossein Mirsepāsi (fa) (1907–1976) – psychologist
 Abolghāsem Ghaffāri (fa) (1907–2013) – scientist
 Mohsen Hashtroodi (1908–1976) – mathematician
 Habib Nafisi (1908–1984) – scholar
 Yahyā Mahdavi (fa) (1908–2000) – psychologist
 Asadollāh Āl-e Bouyeh (fa) (1908–2002) – mathematician
 Dr. Ebrāhim Chehrāzi (fa) (1908–2010) – psychologist
 Dr. Mohammad Gharib (1909–1975) – physician
 Khānbābā Bayāni (fa) (1909–1997) – scholar
 Mohammad Mohaqqeqi (fa) (1910–1970) – cleric
 Ahmad Fardid (1910–1994) – philosopher
 Zabihollāh Safā (1911–1999) – scholar
 Mohammad Moin (1914–1971) – lexicographer
 Parviz Nātel Khānlari (1914–1990) – scholar and politician
 Mostafā Moqarrabi (fa) (1914–1998) – scholar
 Abolghāsem Kheradjou (fa) (1915–1986) – economist
 Hossein Khatibi (fa) (1916–2001) – scholar
 Dr. Ali Farr (fa) (1916–2016) – physician
 Mohammad-Javād Mashkour (fa) (1918–1995) – linguist
 Abbās Yamini Sharif (fa) (1919–1989) – scholar
 Sādegh Kiā (fa) (1920–2001) – linguist
 Fereydoun Ādamiyat (1920–2008) – historian and diplomat
 Enāyatollāh Rezā (1920–2010) – historian
 Hāshem Kārdoush (fa) (1922–2015) – scholar
 Mortezā Rāvandi (fa) (1923–1999) – historian
 Dr. Noureddin Mojtahedi (fa) (1923–2002) – physician
 Jalāleddin Āshtiāni (fa) (1924–2015) – scholar
 Ehsān Narāghi (1926–2012) – sociologist
 Houshang Alam (fa) (1928–2007) – linguist
 Mahmoud Rouholamini (fa) (1928–2011) – anthropologist
 Dr. Mohammad Shafiezādeh (fa) (1928–2014) – physician
 Seifollāh Kāmbakhshfard (1929–2010) – archaeologist
 Bāgher Āqeli (fa) (1929–2013) – historian
 Dr. Hājeb Mortāz (fa) (b. 1931) – physician
 Zardosht Houshvar (fa) (b. 1931) – scholar
 Mazāher Mosaffā (fa) (1932–2019) – scholar
 Dr. Mortezā Katbi (fa) (b. 1932) – psychologist
 Mohammad-Taghi Sadr (fa) (1933–2018) – mathematician
 Yahyā Ardalān (fa) (1934–2014) – scholar
 Seyyed Nasrollah Sadrolhoffazi (1934-2022) – judge
 Mohammad-Rahim Sarrāf (fa) (b. 1936) – archaeologist
 Ahmad Tafazzoli (1937–1997) – linguist
 Hormoz Milāniān (fa) (1937–2014) – linguist
 Abbās Shafiei (1937–2016) – chemist
 Dāriush Āshouri (b. 1938) – scholar
 Dāriush Farhoud (fa) (b. 1938) – physician
 Abbās Alijānzādeh Ārāni (fa) (b. 1938) – linguist
 Shamseddin Mojābi (1939–2012) – scholar
 Mohammad-Rezā Ziāei (fa) (b. 1939) – scholar
 Dāriush Farhoud (fa) (b. 1939) – physician
 Ahmad Kāzemi (fa) (b. 1940) – historian
 Amir Hassanpour (1943–2017) – linguist
 Bahman Keshāvarz (fa) (1944–2019) – lawyer
 Ali Tābandeh Mahboub-Ali Shāh (fa) (1945–1997) – Sufi leader
 Jāber Anāsori (fa) (1945–2016) – scholar
 Mohsen Ghāne Basiri (1949–2017) – scholar
 Kāmrān Nejātollāhi (fa) (1954–1978) – scholar
 Mohammad Karamoddini (b. 1955) – scholar
 Ahmad Hātami (fa) (1960–2015) – scholar

Artists and writers

 Mirzā Ali-Akbar Khān Mozayyan od-Dowleh (fa) (1844–1920) – painter and musician
 Mirzā Mehdi Khān Shaqāqi Momtahen od-Dowleh (fa) (1844–1920) – architect
 Mohammad Khān Ghaffāri Kamāl ol-Molk (1847–1940) – painter
 Mirzā Aboutorāb Ghaffāri (fa) (1847–1890) – painter
 Prince Abdollāh Mirzā (fa) (1850–1908) – photographer
 Esmāil Jalāyer (19th cent.) – painter
 Gholām-Rezā Khān Minbāshiān (fa) (1861–1935) – musician
 Arsalān Khān Nāser Homāyoun (fa) (1866–1920) – musician
 Fekri Ershād Moayed ol-Mamālek (1869–1916) – playwright
 Hossein-Ali Khān Hendesi Gorān (fa) (1871–1932) – architect
 Gholām-Hossein Khān Darvish (1872–1926) – musician
 Mirzā Ahmad Khān Mahmoudi Kamāl ol-Vezāreh (fa) (1874–1930) – playwright
 Hossein Hangāfarin (fa) (1875–1952) – musician
 Mehdi Ivānov (fa) (1875–1968) – photographer
 Ali-Akbar Dehkhodā (1879–1956) – politician, author and linguist
 Hādi Hāeri (fa) (1886–1977) – writer
 Esmāil Āshtiāni (fa) (1892–1970) – scholar
 Hossein Jodat (fa) (1892–1990) – writer
 Abbās Forāt Yazdi (ar) (1894–1968) – poet
 Abdollāh Dādvar (fa) (1894–1977) – musician
 Ali-Akbar Kāveh (fa) (1894–1990) – calligrapher
 Hossein Gol-e Golāb (1895–1985) – musician
 Mohammad-Ali Amirjāhed (fa) (1896–1977) – songwriter
 Ebrāhim Mansouri (fa) (1899–1970) – musician
 Esmāil Zarrinfar (fa) (1901–1993) – musician
 Mortezā Moshfeq Kāzemi (ru) (1902–1978) – novelist
 Javād Badiezādeh (fa) (1902–1980) – musician
 Sādegh Hedāyat (1903–1951) – novelist
 Abolhassan Amidi (fa) (1903–1980) – writer and journalist
 Mirzā Soroush Lohrāsp (fa) (1904–1980) – writer and philanthropist
 Esmāil Mehrtāsh (fa) (1904–1996) – musician
 Ahmad Ārām (fa) (1904–1998) – writer
 Mohammad-Taghi Mostafavi (fa) (1905–1980) – archaeologist
 Rezā Mashāyekhi (fa) (1905–1990) – translator
 Hossein-Ali Vaziritabār (fa) (1906–1958) – musician
 Rouhollāh Khāleghi (1906–1965) – musician
 Hassan Rādmard (fa) (1906–1978) – musician
 Hassan Mashhoun (fa) (1906–1979) – musician
 Masoud Farzād (fa) (1906–1981) – writer
 Gholām-Hossein Khān Minbāshiān (fa) (1907–1980) – musician
 Mohammad-Hossein Shahriār (1907–1988) – poet
 Ebrāhim Sahbā (fa) (1911–1999) – writer
 Houshang Vaziri (fa) (1911–2003) – journalist
 Mehdi Barkeshli (fa) (1912–1988) – musician
 Ahmad Nāzerzādeh (fa) (1913–1976) – writer
 Mohammad Ghāzi (1913–1998) – writer and translator
 Lotfollāh Mofakham-Pāyān (fa) (1915–1984) – musician
 Ebrāhim Karimābādi (1917–1981) – journalist
 Jafar Bozorgi (fa) (1917–2006) – actor
 Ebrāhim Modarresi (fa) (1918–2007) – writer and journalist
 Mohammad-Hossein Jalili (fa) (1919–1979) – poet
 Mohammad Bahmanbeigi (1920–2010) – writer and philanthropist
 Jalāl Āl-e Ahmad (1923–1969) – writer
 Houshang Montaseri (fa) (1923–2015) – translator
 Dāriush Asadzādeh (fa) (1923–2019) – actor
 Abdollāh Tavakkol (fa) (1924–1999) – translator
 Fereydoun Moshiri (1926–2000) – poet
 Hassan Tofigh (fa) (1926–2020) – cartoonist and journalist
 Siāvash Kasrāei (1927–1996) – poet
 Mohammad-Taghi Masoudieh (fa) (1927–1999) – musician
 Homāyoun Nour-Ahmar (fa) (1927–2013) – translator
 Mahmoud Tolouei (fa) (1930–2015) – writer
 Ahmad Rasoulzādeh (fa) (1930–2015) – voice actor
 Ahmad Samiei (fa) (b. 1930) – musician
 Jahāngir Malek (fa) (1933–2002) – musician
 Farāmarz Pāyvar (1933–2009) – musician
 Farrokh Tamimi (fa) (1934–2002) – poet
 Dāvoud Navvābi (fa) (b. 1934) – translator
 Manouchehr Neyestāni (fa) (1936–1982) – poet
 Fereydoun Farrokhzād (1936–1992) – singer and poet
 Bāgher Āyatollāhzādeh (fa) (1936–2007) – architect
 Nāder Ebrāhimi (1936–2008) – writer
 Mohsen Sharif (fa) (1936–2016) – writer
 Esmāil Shangeleh (fa) (b. 1936) – actor
 Bahrām Beyzāei (b. 1938) – film director
 Abolhassan Tahāminejād (fa) (b. 1938) – voice actor
 Nowzar Parang (fa) (1937–2006) – songwriter
 Mohammad-Ali Sepānlou (1940–2015) – poet
 Ahmadreza Ahmadi (b. 1940) – poet and screen writer
 Mohammad-Ebrāhim Jafari (fa) (1940–2018) – painter
 Manouchehr Ehterāmi (fa) (1941–2009) – writer
 Mostafā Eslāmieh (fa) (1941–2016) – writer
 Mohammad-Ali Najafi (fa) (b. 1945) – film director
 Masoud Houshmand (fa) (1946–2010) – songwriter
 Atāollāh Omaidvār (fa) (b. 1946) – architect and painter
 Hamid-Rezā Afshār (fa) (b. 1955) – actor

See also
 Danesh
 Higher education in Iran
 Alborz High School
 Academy of Gundishapur
 Nizamiyyah
 List of universities in Iran
 List of Iranian scientists from the pre-modern era.
 Modern Iranian scientists and engineers
 List of Iranian Research Centers
 School of Nisibis
 Sarouyeh
 Baku State University (Baku State Dar ul-Funun)
 Istanbul University (Dar ul-Funun in Turkey)

References and notes

Further reading

External links
 
Dar al-Funun in jazirehdanesh 
Encyclopedia Iranica: Dar Al-Fonun

University of Tehran
History of education in Iran
Universities in Tehran
History of Tehran
Architecture in Iran
Educational institutions established in 1851
1851 establishments in Iran
Higher education in Iran
Buildings of the Qajar period